Volodymyr Anatoliyovych Zayarnyi (born 25 November 1970) is a Ukrainian professional football coach and a former player.

Club career
He made his professional debut in the Soviet Top League in 1988 for FC Chornomorets Odessa.

References

1970 births
Footballers from Odesa
Living people
Soviet footballers
Ukrainian footballers
Association football defenders
FC Chornomorets Odesa players
SC Odesa players
FC Nyva Ternopil players
FC Metalurh Zaporizhzhia players
Hapoel Beit She'an F.C. players
Maccabi Acre F.C. players
FC KAMAZ Naberezhnye Chelny players
FC Sokol Saratov players
FC Chernomorets Novorossiysk players
FC Arsenal Tula players
FK Liepājas Metalurgs players
Ukrainian Premier League players
Ukrainian First League players
Russian Premier League players
Latvian Higher League players
Ukrainian expatriate footballers
Expatriate footballers in Israel
Expatriate footballers in Russia
Expatriate footballers in Latvia
Ukrainian football managers